Nová Baňa is a small town in the west of central Slovakia and the largest town of the Žarnovica District, located in the Banská Bystrica Region.

Etymology
The original name of Nová Baňa was Štiavnica - derived from the still existing spring water ( - "acid water").  The town was first mentioned as nova montanya Schewnyche (1337). The Slovak name was adopted also by German colonists (Schennych, Sewniche). Contemporary description noua montanya regis (new royal mine) became the basis of newer Slovak (Nová Baňa), German (Königsberg) and Hungarian name (Újbánya).  In the mid-14th century, the new name became dominant probably to distinguish the town from Banská Štiavnica.

Geography 
Nová Baňa lies in right bank of Hron river. Nová Baňa region is surrounded by a ring of volcanic mountains (Štiavnica Mountains on the east, Pohronský Inovec on the south-west and Vtáčnik on the north-west). Seven kilometers from Nová Baňa, close by the village Tekovská Breznica, is the youngest volcano in Central Europe called Putikov vŕšok.

History 
Early settlement of the area is documented by old Slavonic hillfort Zámčisko built on the place of older Hallstatt hillfort. In the late 13th century, there was probably not any more significant village but dispersed Slovak settlements. Later, the burghers from Kremnica and Pukanec settled here, because gold was discovered in the area. In 1345 Nová Baňa became a "free royal mining town". The German "guests" had an important role in the development and administration of the town (almost all recorded names of mayors and members of the town council are exclusively German).  In the 15th century, the town became less attractive for German miners because of the decline of the mining activities. Thereafter, Slovaks strengthen their position in the town and began to participate in the administration. The mines were closed down in 1887.

Demographics 
According to the 2001 census, the town had 7,505 inhabitants. 97.51% of inhabitants were Slovaks, 0.85 Ukrainians and 0.48% Czechs. The religious makeup was 82.53% Roman Catholics, 11.50% people with no religious affiliation and 1.00% Orthodox.

Twin towns — sister cities

Nová Baňa is twinned with:
 Mimoň, Czech Republic
 Nin, Croatia

References

External links 
Municipal website

Cities and towns in Slovakia
Villages and municipalities in Žarnovica District